Anamika is a genus of fungi in the family Hymenogastraceae. Anamika was formerly placed in the family Cortinariaceae, but a molecular phylogenetics study found it to be closely related to Hebeloma, which is in the family Hymenogastraceae. Species of Anamika have small basidiocarps with non-hygrophanous caps that are smooth, glabrous and slightly sticky when moist; a pileus margin that is incurved and entire when young and becomes decurved and fissile with age; and a pale brown context. Their lamellae are adnate; their stipes are central, terete, equal or enlarged towards both ends, slightly furfuraceous with a cortina when young, which often leaves inconspicuous annular remnants. Their spore prints are brown. Their spores are amygdaliform to sublimoniform, thick-walled, epitunica strongly developed with cavernous type of ornamentation, with a conspicuous callus and without germ-pore. The edges of their lamellae are sterile with cheilocystidia; pleurocystidia present similar to cheilocystidia. Their hymenophoral trama is regular. Their pileipellis an epicutis, repent thin-walled hyphae with pale brownish incrustation. Their caulocystidia occur in small clusters or scattered. Clamp connections are present in all tissues.

Distribution
Anamika species are known from India, Thailand, China and Japan. Anamika indica has been recorded from semi-evergreen to evergreen forests in the Western Ghats, Kerala, India. It occurs solitary, gregarious to scattered on soil under Dipterocarpus sp. probably forming ectomycorrhiza.

References

Hymenogastraceae
Agaricales genera
Taxa named by Meinhard Michael Moser